NGC 4517 is a spiral galaxy located approximately 40 million light-years away in the constellation of Virgo. It was discovered in 1784 by William Herschel. It is a member of the Virgo II Groups, a series of galaxies and galaxy clusters strung out from the southern edge of the Virgo Supercluster.

Gallery

References

External links 
 

Unbarred spiral galaxies
4517
Virgo (constellation)
Discoveries by William Herschel
041618